Salt River is a suburb of Cape Town, located near Table Bay, to the east of Cape Town's central business district. Salt River is served by a railway station of the same name, and has the postcode 7925. It is noted for its association with the clothing and textiles industry. The name Salt River is a translation of the Dutch "Soutrivier".

History
Prior to its establishment as a community within Cape Town the area was inhabited by the Goringhaiqua Khoikhoi clan. In 1510 it was the scene of the Battle of Salt River between the Portuguese and the Goringhaiqua.

Once a booming part of Cape Town because of its close proximity to the CBD, Salt River was the industrial heart of Cape Town.

The steel and locomotive industries were important in the suburbs' early development due to the expansion of the rail network in the early 1900s.

Up until the late 1980s prominent industries also included textile and clothing manufacturing. However, due to the influx of cheaper, imported clothing many of the clothing factories closed and are being redeveloped.

Due to Salt River's proximity to central Cape Town and large manufacturing plants, the suburb became popular with Cape Malays and the so-called coloured working class. Most of the Cape Malays and "coloureds" moved here from District 6 in the late 1950s and early 1960s, even before the "forced removals" from District 6, c. 1967. Cape Malays and "coloureds" could buy houses in Salt River but Indians could not. However Indians were allowed to live in Salt River provided they buy or rent a house attached to a corner grocer shop. On almost every corner in Salt River there used to be grocer shops where people could buy daily necessities over the counter. Today Salt River is still largely populated by second and third generations of Cape Malay and "Coloured" families. "Coloured" people are mostly of the Christian faith. Salt River is known to be one of the most religiously tolerant suburbs in the Cape, with Cape Malays, who are of the Muslim faith and "coloured" Christians getting along very well. There are several churches in the area and two mosques (Masjids)- one in Tennyson Street (Muhammadiyah Masjid) and one in Addison Road.

For such a small town Salt River has many primary schools, merely a road or two apart from each other, and two high schools. Dryden Street Primary School has been there since c. 1960. There is also Cecil Road Primary School. In the past there was also Kipling Street Primary School but because it was a Muslim school and not subsidized by the government, it could not survive financially and closed its doors c. 2010. Other primary schools were St. Mary's and Wesley Training College which had grades from Sub A through to Std. 10 (Matric) - today it is referred to as Grade 12. The other high school is Salt River High School. At one point (c. 1976) this high school became too small to accommodate the pupils of, not only the area (Salt River), but also from further afield, Woodstock, Maitland and Kensington. An annex was found in the old school (previous called Wolraad Woltemade - a whites only school) in Kent Street, with its front on Albert Road, Salt River. Several Std 6 and Std 7 classes were sent there while only one each English and Afrikaans Std 6 & Std 7 were still at Salt River High School in Rochester Road, together with the rest of the school which now comprised Std 8 to 10. When the Kent Street pupils finished Std 6 and Std 7, they returned to Rochester Road to complete high school there.

Salt River was a self-contained little community from the 1960s to 1990's when few people had cars and when cars were not even a necessity because of Salt River's close proximity to Cape Town. The buses (City Tramways and Golden Arrow) and trains were always very efficient. One could even walk into town along either the Lower Main Road which joined Albert Road at the circle in Salt River or along Victoria Road which runs into Sir Lowry Road. Victoria Road is sometimes also called the "top" Main Road. In the Lower Main Road there has always been many shops, department stores (Foschini, Universal Stores - which was taken over by Edgars) and well known chain stores, like BLOCH Supermarket, which was taken over by SHOPRITE in the 1970s. Because of this self-containment, residents of Salt River rarely found the need to venture too far from home, with the result that they were not really affected by discontented feelings of what came to be known in the Apartheid era as "the previously disadvantaged" peoples. The mood of Salt River residents have always been more relaxed and contented. Also for this reason many of the second and third generations have preferred to stay in the suburb in houses which are over a 100 years old, even if now they can afford to live in wealthier suburbs.

As a result of South Africa's prolonged recession many businesses in the area closed while unemployment and crime increased. A rise in gangs and drug use in the suburb in the mid-1990s led to the formation of the militant group PAGAD. On the evening of 4 August 1996 members of the group marched to the Salt River home of gang leader Rashaad Staggie in London Road where they attacked, shot and burned him alive.

The suburb has been pegged for revival as part of a R20bn urban renewal initiative across Cape Town.

Geography
Salt River is named after a river of the same name. The Salt River is formed by the confluence of the Liesbeek and Black Rivers. The river has been canalised and flows into Table Bay between Paarden Eiland and Brooklyn.

Notable locations 

 Community House, a site of historical civic activism that houses NGOs and trade unions.

References

Suburbs of Cape Town